Eupithecia falkneri is a moth in the family Geometridae. It is found in Algeria.

References

Moths described in 1978
falkneri
Moths of Africa